Yarbaşı is a village in the Gölbaşı District, Adıyaman Province, Turkey. The village is populated by Kurds of the Balyan tribe and had a population of 494 in 2021.

References

Villages in Gölbaşı District, Adıyaman Province

Kurdish settlements in Adıyaman Province